Simon Trier Jakobsen (born 6 July 1998) is a Danish professional footballer who plays as a centre-back for Kolding IF.

Club career

Viborg FF
Born in Gjessø, Trier joined Viborg FF from AC Horsens at his first year as a U17 player. In the 2016–17 season, Trier was on the bench two times for the first team squad in the Danish Superliga and one time in the Danish Cup. He was then promoted permanently into the first team squad from the beginning of the 2017–18 season.

On 30 July 2017, Trier got his debut for Viborg FF. Trier started on the left back but was substituted in the 72nd minute due to an injury. He was afterwards sidelined for one month with a groin injury. Trier managed to play nine games for the first team in his first season as a senior player.

In April 2018, Trier got his contract extended until June 2019. On 1 June 2019, his contract was extended once again, this time with three-years. A few days later, he was also called up by the Danish U-20 nation team.

Kolding IF
On 9 January 2020, Kolding IF announced that Trier had joined the club on a contract until the summer 2022. Trier got his debut for the club on 29 February 2020 against Næstved BK, playing all 90 minutes.

Thisted and return to Kolding
On 16 August 2022, Trier signed with Thisted FC. However, four months later, ahead of 2023, Trier returned to Kolding IF.

References

External links
 
 Simon Trier at DBU

Living people
1998 births
Association football fullbacks
Danish men's footballers
Danish Superliga players
Danish 1st Division players
Viborg FF players
Kolding IF players
Thisted FC players
Denmark youth international footballers
People from Silkeborg Municipality
AC Horsens players
Sportspeople from the Central Denmark Region